"The Removal Men" is the sixth episode of the second series of the 1960s cult British spy-fi television series The Avengers, starring Patrick Macnee and Julie Stevens. It was first broadcast by ABC on 3 November 1962. The episode was directed by Don Leaver and written by Roger Marshall and Jeremy Scott.

Plot
Steed goes undercover to infiltrate a clique of assassins based in France.

Music
Julie Stevens sings "An Occasional Man" by Ralph Blane and Hugh Martin, accompanied by the Dave Lee Trio. The trio also perform a tune Lee stated he "made up in the studio" for the episode.

Cast
 Patrick Macnee as John Steed
 Julie Stevens as Venus Smith
 Edwin Richfield as Bug Siegel
 Reed De Rouen as Jack Dragna
 Patricia Denys as Cecile Dragna 
 George Roderick as Charlie Binaggio
 Douglas Muir as One Ten 
 Hira Talfrey as Charlie Bonnay   
 Edina Ronay as Nicole Cauvin 
 Donald Tandy as Godard   
 Ivor Dean as Harbour Officer  
 Hugo De Vernier as Jailer
 George Little as Waiter

References

External links

Episode overview on The Avengers Forever! website

The Avengers (season 2) episodes
1962 British television episodes